The International Federation of Organic Agriculture Movements (IFOAM - Organics International) is the worldwide umbrella organization for the organic agriculture movement, which represents close to 800 affiliates in 117 countries.

History 

IFOAM – Organics International was started by the president of the French farmer organization Nature et Progrès, Roland Chevriot. The process began on 05 November 1972, in Versailles, France, during an international organic agriculture congress organized by Nature et Progrès.

There were five members at the congress representing different organizations including Lady Eve Balfour of the Soil Association of the United Kingdom, Kjell Arman of the Swedish Biodynamic Association, Pauline Raphaely of the Soil Association of South Africa, Jerome Goldstein of Rodale Press of the United States, and Roland Chevriot of Nature et Progrès of France.

In the beginning, the name of the organization was the International Federation of Organic Agriculture Movements. The founders envisioned that the federation would meet what they saw as a major need: a unified, organized voice for organic food and the diffusion and exchange of information on the principles and practices of organic agriculture across national and geographical boundaries. In 2015, the name changed to IFOAM - Organics International.

On 19 October 1998, participants at the 12th Scientific Conference of IFOAM - Organics International issued the Mar del Plata Declaration, where more than 600 delegates from over 60 countries voted unanimously to exclude the use of genetically modified organisms (GMOs) in food production and agriculture. From that point onwards, GMOs have been categorically excluded from organic farming and denounced by the organic movement.

Structure

The GA of IFOAM – Organics International serves as the highest authority of the organization, and it elects the world board of the organization for a three-year term. The world board is a group of 10 people working voluntarily to guide the organization. In September 2021, Karen Mapusua from Fiji was elected as the president of the organization’s world board.

The 2021 world board was elected by the GA of IFOAM - Organics International in September 2021, the first-ever digital one. The Intercontinental Network of Organic Farmers Organizations (INOFO) is an autonomous self-organized structure within IFOAM - Organics International for organic farming organizations. The board appoints members to official committees, working groups, and task forces based on the recommendation of the membership of the organization. Member organizations also establish regional bodies and sector platforms. These regional bodies include IFOAM Organics Europe, IFOAM Organics Asia, IFOAM AgriBioMediterraneo, IFOAM Southern African Network, IFOAM America Latina, IFOAM North America and IFOAM Euro-Asia. The sector platforms formed include the IFOAM Organic Husbandry Alliance, IFOAM Apiculture Forum, IFOAM Aquaculture, Technology Innovation Platform of IFOAM and IFOAM Seeds Platform.

International standing
IFOAM - Organics International actively participates in international agricultural and environmental negotiations with the United Nations and multilateral institutions to further the interests of the organic agricultural movement worldwide, and has observer status or is otherwise accredited by the following international institutions:

 ECOSOC Status with the United Nations General Assembly
 The Food and Agriculture Organization of the United Nations (FAO)
 The United Nations Framework Convention on Climate Change (UNFCCC)
 The United Nations Convention to Combat Desertification (UNCCD)
 The United Nations Convention on Biological Diversity (UNCBD)
 United Nations Conference on Trade and Development (UNCTAD)
 Codex Alimentarius Commission (FAO and World Health Organization)
 United Nations Environment Program (UNEP)
 The Organisation for Economic Co-operation and Development (OECD)
 International Labour Organization of the United Nations (ILO)
 International Organization for Standardization (ISO)

According to the One World Trust's Global Accountability Report 2008, IFOAM - Organics International was the highest-scoring international NGO. It was at the top of the list of 30 organizations that year, with a 71%t score.

Membership

Members are organizations with at least 50% organic-related activity and are part of the General Assembly, where they have voting rights. Organizations with less than 50% organic-related activities are considered associate members. Individuals join as supporters. The membership includes farmers' organizations, trade associations, processors, handlers, retailers, consumer groups, and civil society organizations. Listed below are some of IFOAM – Organics International’s members. The full list can be found in the organization’s membership directory.

 Alnatura
 Alliance for Organic Integrity
 Asociación Nacional de Agricultura Orgánica
 Bio Austria
 Biokreis e.V.
 Bioland e.V.
 Biopark
 Bio Suisse
 BioVision Africa Trust
 Bund Ökologische Lebensmittelwirtschaft / Association of Organic Food Producers and Traders
 COOP Switzerland
 Coöperatieve Vereniging Bionext U.A
 Demeter International
 Ecocert
 Ecovin
 Fédération Nationale d'Agriculture Biologique des Régions de Franc
 Gäa e.V.
 Garden Organic
 Global Organic Alliance, Inc
 Korean Federation of Sustainable Agriculture Organizations
 Lantbrukarnas Riksförbund / Federation of Swedish Farmers
 MAYACERT S.A.
 Migros
 Movimiento Argentino para la Producción Orgánica
 Nature et Progrès
 Naturland e.V.
 Navdanya
 Organic Denmark
 Organic Trade Association
 Organic Crop Improvement Association
 Organic Food Development Center
 SEKEM
 Soil Association
 Zimbabwe Organic Producers & Promoters Association

Activities

IFOAM - Organics International and Standards and Certification 

IFOAM - Organics International has developed services aimed at operators and stakeholders across the organic sector, for instance, the Organic Guarantee System (OGS). OGS is designed to facilitate the development of sustainable and credible organic sectors, trustworthy organic standards and accessible verification systems.

IFOAM – Organics International has also been supporting and promoting the diversity of guarantee systems, including Participatory Guarantee Systems (PGS) and Internal Control Systems (ICS).

IFOAM Family of Standards

The organization, in collaboration with the Food and Agriculture Organization (FAO) and the United Nations Conference on Trade and Development (UNCTAD), developed an international equivalence assessments matrix of organic standards and technical regulations, which is known as the Common Objectives and Requirements of Organic Standards (COROS). The COROS is the basis for assessing the quality and equivalency of organic standards and regulations, which are then included in the IFOAM Family of Standards (FoS).

The IFOAM FoS program was launched in 2011; by 2022, 47 standards and regulations were included worldwide.

Participatory Guarantee Systems (PGS)

PGS are locally focused quality assurance systems. PGS represent an alternative and complementary tool to third-party certification within the organic sector. IFOAM – Organics International continues to advocate for PGS’S recognition by governments.

To do so, IFOAM – Organics International conducts several activities, such as collecting global data, managing a Global PGS Map, running the Official PGS Recognition Program, and sharing resources via its PGS Toolkit, educational videos and case studies.

Accreditation and  IOAS

IFOAM - Organics International offers organic accreditation services to certification bodies (CBs), via the accreditation body IOAS. The IFOAM Accreditation Program, launched in 1992, follows the IFOAM Accreditation Requirements (which are included in the IFOAM Norms). Certifiers can have their processes audited against the IFOAM Accreditation Requirements, which analyze the standards and verification processes of the CBs. 4.1.4 Internal Control System (ICS)

An Internal Control System (ICS) is a documented quality assurance system that allows an external certification body to delegate the annual inspection of individual group members (farmers) to an identified body or unit within the certified operator.

IFOAM – Organics International has played a key role in harmonizing and promoting the ICS concept since the 1990s. It has been advocating for group certification with governments and stakeholders within the organic sector, and it has been publishing resources such as a Training Kit on ICS for Smallholder Group Certification and an ICS Guidance in the framework of the EU Regulation 2018/848.

5.Projects and Grant Agreements 

 The Organic Academy: this was established in 2012 by IFOAM - Organics International to deliver a service to strengthen capacities, including skills for leadership in the organic sector and movement. A new format for capacity building included the flagship Organic Leadership Course, training (of the team) of trainers, and Organic Foundational Course. The format also includes tailored training based on the demand and needs of stakeholders, for example, the Capacity Development of Regional and National Multipliers in Ecological Organic Agriculture in Southern, Central and West Africa with Deutsche Gesellschaft für Internationale Zusammenarbeit (GIZ) GmbH as the donor.
 Knowledge Center for Organic Agriculture in Africa (KCOA), East Africa Hub with Biovision Africa as the donor. The project aims to deliver the Training of Teams of Facilitators component.
 Organic Agriculture Policy-Implementation Support and Capacity Building Project in the Kyrgyz Republic funded by the Korean Development Agency, and supported by Korea International Cooperation Agency (KOICA). The role is to deliver the Training of Trainers component.
 Support of the Organic Agriculture Working Group of the Green Innovation Centre project (2017-2023) with Deutsche Gesellschaft für Internationale Zusammenarbeit (GIZ) GmbH as the donor.
 Organic Trade for Development in Eastern Europe (OT4D), funded by the Swiss Secretariat of Economic Development (SECO)
 Nutrition in Mountain Agro-Ecosystems (NMA) 
 ProBio, funded by the Federal Ministry for Economic Cooperation and Development (BMZ), through SEQUA
 Organic Markets for Development (OM4D) 
 Peer to Peer Exchange Among Policy Makers, funded by BMZ and the Swiss Agency for Development and Cooperation (SDC)
 Scaling Up Agroecology in the Himalayas, funded by BMZ and International Fund for Agricultural Development (IFAD)
 Gender-sensitive assessment and capacity development on PGS, funded by FAO
 Agribusiness Development from Organic Resources (ADORE), funded by the European Development Fund under the Boosting Agriculture and Food Security (BAFS) Project Promotion of Agribusiness and Innovative Farming

See also
Environmental justice
EU-Eco-regulation
Global Ecolabelling Network
Association Kokopelli
Heirloom plant
UTZ Certified

References

External links
 Official Web site of IFOAM
  ISEAL Alliance
 One World Trust: Global Accountability Report 2008
 International Organic Accreditation Service
 Movimiento Agroecológico Latinoamericano A Latin and Caribbean equivalent
IFOAM EU

Organic farming organizations
International environmental organizations
Agricultural marketing organizations
International organisations based in Germany
Organisations based in Bonn
Organic food certification organizations
Agricultural organisations based in Germany
Non-profit organisations based in North Rhine-Westphalia